The Earth Is Thirsty is a 1930 Soviet drama film directed by Yuli Raizman.

Plot 
The village of the Turkmen aul does not have enough water, which forces the inhabitants to obey the Aman-Durdi-bai. One day they are visited by a group of students at the Hydrotechnical University. The Komsomol offer the peasants an expedition to the hills of Timur, which limits the flow of water into the desert, which Aman-Durdi-bai does not like.

Starring 
 Y. Agramov 
 I. Aksyonov
 Kira Andronikashvili
 Dmitri Konsovsky
 Nikoloz Sanishvili
 S. Sletov
 L. Vikhrev		
 Mikhail Vinogradov

References

External links 

1930 films
1930s Russian-language films
Soviet drama films
1930 drama films
Soviet black-and-white films